Charlotte Englebert (born 20 May 2001) is a field hockey player from Belgium, who plays as a midfielder.

Career

Club hockey
In the Belgian Hockey League, Englebert plays club hockey for the Royal Racing Club.

National teams

Under–18
In 2018, Charlotte Englebert was a member of the Belgium U–18 team at the EuroHockey Youth Championship in Santander. At the tournament, Belgium finished in second place, taking home silver.

Under–21
Following her debut for the Under–18 side in 2018, Englebert appeared in the national Under–21 in 2019. She represented the team at the EuroHockey Junior Championship in Valencia. The team finished fourth, qualifying for the 2021 FIH Junior World Cup.

In july 2022, she made her last appearance with the national Under–21. She represented the team at the EuroHockey Junior Championship in Ghent, Belgium. The team finished second, qualifying for the 2023 FIH Junior World Cup.

Red Panthers
Charlotte Englebert made her debut for the Belgium 'Red Panthers' in 2018 during a test series against the United States in Lancaster.

References

External links
 
 

2001 births
Living people
Female field hockey midfielders
Belgian female field hockey players
Royal Racing Club Bruxelles players